John Kassir (born October 24, 1957) is an American actor and comedian. He is known for his work as the voice of the Cryptkeeper in HBO's Tales from the Crypt franchise. He is also known for his role as Ralph in the off-Broadway show Reefer Madness and its 2005 film adaptation. He is also the current voice of Scrooge McDuck since 2016, after the death of Alan Young.

Early life 
John Kassir was born on October 24, 1957, in Baltimore, Maryland, to an Iraqi father from Mosul and a Syrian mother from  Mardin, present-day Turkey. He is of Assyrian descent. As a child, he would often do impressions in school and was described as a "class clown". His mother would often buy props for him and he would entertain customers who were shopping outside of Eudowood Plaza. He graduated from Loch Raven High School and attended Towson State University where he studied theatre. He and several other students formed a comedy troupe called Animal Crackers.

Career

Stand-up comedy
Kassir originally began his career in stand-up comedy, he first became known in 1985, when he defeated Sinbad for best stand-up comic on Star Search.

As a stand-up comic, he has opened for the likes of Lou Rawls, Tom Jones, The Temptations and Four Tops on their TNT Tour, Bobby Vinton, Richard Belzer, U2, and Harry Blackstone, Jr. among others. John has also appeared on stage performing improvisation with Robin Williams.

Film and television
His film credits include, And Then There Was Eve as G. Alexander, Flora & Ulysses as Ulysses', Hellblazers as Rick, Jack the Giant Slayer, Monster Mash as Igor, Monster Mutt as Pet Shop Pete, Reefer Madness: The Movie Musical as Ralph Wiley and Uncle Sam, Smothered and Spy Hard as Rancor Guard.

In television, he played the Bulgarian kicker, Zagreb Shkenusky, for 7 years in the HBO comedy series 1st & Ten, about a fictional football team. His other live-action credits include sketch-acting on The Amanda Show and a portrayal of Shemp Howard in the 2000 TV biopic The Three Stooges, produced by Mel Gibson, and Ralph in Reefer Madness: The Movie Musical. He was also able to get his own Pee-wee Herman style show in 1997 called Johnnytime, which aired for two seasons on the USA network. He also appeared as The Atom in the Justice League of America pilot episode, which, despite not being picked up, was released as a film in some markets. Kassir has appeared in over a dozen feature films, starred in eight TV pilots (six of which went to series and two of which lasted on air for over six years each) and guest-starred in dozens of TV series in both comic and dramatic roles.

Voice acting
Kassir has specialized in voice-over work for animation, video games, and other productions, most notably as the voice of Crypt Keeper in Tales from the Crypt. He would later voice Ray "Raymundo" Rocket in Rocket Power. He also provided the voice for the mercenary Deadpool in the video games X-Men Legends II: Rise of Apocalypse, Marvel: Ultimate Alliance, and Marvel Ultimate Alliance 2, as well as for Sauron and Pyro, two other well-known characters. He was also featured in the very first commercial for the Nintendo cornerstone video game series The Legend of Zelda in the United States in 1987.

Kassir provided the vocal effects of the mischievous raccoon Meeko in Disney's 1995 animated feature Pocahontas and Pocahontas II: Journey to a New World. Also, he provided the voice of Buster Bunny in four Tiny Toon Adventures episodes (following Charlie Adler's departure from the role). He played the villainous Scuttlebutt in An American Tail: The Treasure of Manhattan Island. He also made one voice appearance in an episode of Ben 10, (Last Laugh) as Zombozo. He voiced the character Adam MacIntyre and provided Additional voice over work in the video game Dead Rising. His voice is featured in the games Shadows of the Damned and Metal Gear Rising: Revengeance as Hell demons and Desperado Enforcement captain Monsoon, respectively.

In 2011, he voiced Crazy Smurf in the live-action/animated film The Smurfs, and in 2012, he voiced Jealousy as well as Gumball, Penny, Leslie, Carrie & Darwin when he possesses them in The Amazing World of Gumball episode "The Flower". Kassir appeared in Bryan Singer's Jack the Giant Slayer (2013), along with Bill Nighy, as Fallon, the two-headed leader of the giants; Nighy played the big head while Kassir played the small head.

Additionally, he voiced Buster Bunny (taking over from Charlie Adler late in the final season of Tiny Toon Adventures), Ray "Raymundo" Rocket on Rocket Power, the mischievous raccoon Meeko in Pocahontas and its direct-to-video sequel, Jibolba in the Tak and the Power of Juju video game series, Pete Puma in The Looney Tunes Show, and Deadpool in X-Men Legends II: Rise of Apocalypse and the Marvel: Ultimate Alliance series. Kassir even voiced Elliot the Dragon in Disney's 2016 live-action remake of the 1977 live-action/animated movie Pete's Dragon.

Kassir also voiced Rizzo in the Spyro video game Skylanders: Spyro's Adventure, as well as Ghost Roaster in Skylanders: Giants, Short Cut in Skylanders: Trap Team, and Pit Boss in Skylanders: Imaginators. He is also known for his various roles in the first season of The Amanda Show. He voiced the Ice King in the original Adventure Time pilot, but was replaced by Tom Kenny for the series. He also provided additional voice over work for Eek! The Cat, The Brothers Flub, Sonic the Hedgehog, Dead Rising, Casper's Scare School, Spider-Man 3, Curious George 2: Follow That Monkey!, The Princess and the Frog, Diablo III, Diablo III: Reaper of Souls, Monsters University, The Prophet, Minions, Halo 5: Guardians, The Secret Life of Pets, Despicable Me 3, The Grinch and The Secret Life of Pets 2.

Theatre
A few of his many theater credits include: originating the role of Kenny in Three Guys Naked From The Waist Down (also starring Scott Bakula), for which he was nominated for both a Drama Desk and an Outer Critics Circle award. John also originated the role of Ralph in the musical Reefer Madness, on stage and in the film version.

Personal life 
He married actress Julie Benz on May 30, 1998, the marriage lasted for nine years until Benz filed for divorce in December 2007.

Filmography

Film 

 American Scary – Himself – Crypt Keeper
 And Then There Was Eve – G. Alexander
 Beethoven's Christmas Adventure - Stray Dog 
 Casper - voice of the Crypt Keeper
 Flora & Ulysses – Ulysses' vocal effects
 Hellblazers – Rick
 Jack the Giant Slayer – General Fallon's small head
 Monster Mash – Igor
 Monster Mutt – Pet Shop Pete
 Pete's Dragon – Elliot's vocals
 Race to Witch Mountain - Chuck
 Reefer Madness: The Movie Musical – Ralph Wiley and Uncle Sam in "Tell 'Em the Truth"
 Smothered – Himself
 Spy Hard – Rancor Guard at intercom
 Tales From the Crypt Presents: Bordello of Blood voice of The Crypt Keeper
 Tales From the Crypt Presents: Demon Knight voice of the Crypt Keeper

Television 

 1st & Ten – Zagreb Shkenusky
 Ask Harriet – Kenny
 Beethoven's Christmas Adventure – Stray Dog
 Bizarre Transmissions from the Bermuda Triangle – Himself
 Bones – Lawrence Melvoy
 Boston Common – Frankie
 Brotherly Love – The Crypt Keeper
 Bump and Grind (pilot) – Dick Scorvo
 Castle – Mr. Dreyfus
 Charmed – The Alchemist
 Cold Case – Kip Crowley (Episode: "Greed")
 CSI: Crime Scene Investigation – Hotel Guest (Episode: "Assume Nothing")
 Dream On – Chuck (Episode: "The Guilty Party")
 Dysfunctional with No Filter Paul and Denise – Himself (2016)
 Early Edition – Jersy Carpathian
 Friends – Stanley
 FM – Don Tupsouni
 Grounded for Life – Musgrove
 Hangin' with Mr. Cooper – Photographer
 Hot in Cleveland – The Pope
 In Living Color – Himself
 Jenny – Chaz
 Joan of Arcadia – Mime God
 Johnnytime – Johnny
 Last Chance Lloyd – Teacher
 Lenny – Max
 Love Boat: The Next Wave – Dmitri Shishtokovich
 Malcolm & Eddie – Rooster
 Moonlighting – Police Detective (Episode: "Yours, Very Deadly")
 Mr. Rhodes – Mr. Kotter
 Mystic Cosmic Patrol – Martini Bot
 NCIS – Perry Swan
 New Wave Comedy – Himself
 Philly – Arnie Kellogg
 Secrets of the Cryptkeeper's Haunted House – The Crypt Keeper
 Showtime at the Apollo – Himself
 Sliders – Arnold Potts
 Star Search – Himself
 Star Trek: Voyager – Gar (Episode: "Critical Care")
 Tales from the Crypt – The Crypt Keeper
 Team Knight Rider – Plato
 The Amanda Show – Regular Performer
 The Facts of Life (1 episode) – Andre
 The Handler – Charlie
 The New Mike Hammer – Ventriloquist
 The Single Guy – Maitre 'D, Waiter
 The Three Stooges – Shemp Howard
 The Visitor – Himself
 Tour of Duty – Lenny Pilchowski
 Two Minutes to Midnight – Bob

Animated film 

 An American Tail: The Treasure of Manhattan Island – Scuttlebutt
 And Then There Was Eve – G. Alexander
 Bayonetta: Bloody Fate – Enzo
 Casper's Scare School – P.A. Voice, Additional voices
 Chance Manifest – Ronnie
 Channels – Walter
 Curious George 2: Follow That Monkey! – Additional voices
 Cyber-Tracker 2 – Tripwire
 Despicable Me 3 – Additional voices
 Donner Pass – James Michael Epstein
 Dr. Rage – Moe Moebius
 Encino Woman – Jean Michel
 George of the Jungle 2 – Voice of Rocky, Armando
 Heartstoppers: Horror at the Movies – Voice Over Announcer
 Jack the Giant Slayer – General Fallon's Small Head
 Justice League of America – Atom/Ray Palmer
 McBride: Tune in for Murder – Danny Doyle
 Minions – Additional voices
 Minions: The Rise of Gru - Additional voices
 Minkow – Jim Cowell
 Mockingbird Lane – Tim (uncredited)
 Monsters University – Additional Voices
 Nothing Special – Marty
 No York City –
 Pirate Camp – Blackbeard's Head
 Planes – Additional voices
 Pocahontas – Meeko
 Pocahontas II: Journey to a New World – Meeko
 Reefer Madness: Grass Roots – Himself
 Tales from the Crypt Presents: Ritual – The Crypt Keeper
 Sing – Additional voices
 Sing 2 – Additional voices
 Smothered – Himself
 Soccer Dog: European Cup – Quint
 Spaced Out! – Himself
 Tales from the Crypt: New Year's Shockin' Eve – The Crypt Keeper
 The Dog Days of Winter – Coffee Shop Manager
 The Glass Jar – John
 The Gunrunner Billy Kane – Machinist
 The Horror Hall of Fame II – The Crypt Keeper
 The Midget Stays in the Picture – B List Director
 The Misunderstanding of Carl Jr. – Boots, Berko
 The Princess and the Frog – Additional Voices
 The Prophet – Additional voices
 The Secret Life of Pets – Additional voices
 The Secret Life of Pets 2 – Additional voices
 The Smurfs – Crazy Smurf
 The Smurfs 2 – Crazy Smurf
 The Taker – John
 The Tale of Tillie's Dragon – Herman
 The Wild –
 The Wild Thornberrys Movie – Squirrel #1
 Tiny Toons' Night Ghoulery – Buster Bunny
 Tiny Toons Spring Break – Buster Bunny
 Vidiots – Lester Plotz

Animation 

 Aaahh!!! Real Monsters – Additional voices
 Adventure Time – Additional voices
 Afro Samurai – Soshun
 As Told by Ginger – Winston, Additional voices
 Avatar: The Last Airbender – Chey
 Back at the Barnyard – Winky
 Ben 10 – Zombozo, Thief #1
 Bonkers – Additional voices
 Breadwinners – Additional voices
 Bunnicula – Ash
 Buzz Lightyear of Star Command – Marl, Evan Zarl, Snark, Zinko
 CatDog – Mervis, Dunglap, Additional voices
 Danger Rangers – Fallbot
 DC Super Friends – Joker
 Dexter's Laboratory – Additional voices
 Dota: Dragon's Blood – Vahdrak
 Duckman: Private Dick/Family Man – Additional voices
 Duck the Halls: A Mickey Mouse Christmas Special – Scrooge McDuck
 Earthworm Jim – Snott, Henchrat
 Eek! The Cat – Mittens, Additional voices
 Hercules – Charon
 Johnny Bravo – Additional voices
 Kim Possible – Additional voices
 Kung Fu Panda: Legends of Awesomeness – Sai So, Sanzu
 Mickey Mouse (Holiday special) – Scrooge McDuck (replacing Alan Young)
 Mighty Ducks – Beldar
 My Life as a Teenage Robot – Additional voices
 New Looney Tunes – Pete Puma
 Oh Yeah! Cartoons – Randy, Aunt Broth, Hobart, The Fisherman, Riot Man #1
 Problem Child – Yoji, Murph
 Random! Cartoons – Ice King, Fire Elemental, Bone, The Soldier Flies, Dugly Uckling, Kung Pao Bunny
 Rick and Morty – Blim Blam
 Rocket Power – Ray "Raymundo" Rocket, Additional voices
 Samurai Jack – Scissorsmith
 Scooby-Doo! in Arabian Nights – Haman
 Solar Opposites - The Crypt Keeper
 Super Robot Monkey Team Hyperforce Go! – Wigglenog, Short Mercenary
 Tales from the Cryptkeeper – The Crypt Keeper
 Teamo Supremo – Cheapskate
 Teenage Mutant Ninja Turtles – Dark Beaver, Dave Beaver
 The Adventures of Jimmy Neutron: Boy Genius – Seymour, Student #2, Pants (Ep. When Pants Attack)
 The Brothers Flub – Additional voices
 The Cartoon Cartoon Show – Leopard
 The Flintstones: On the Rocks – Additional voices
 The Grim Adventures of Billy & Mandy – Additional voices
 The Little Mermaid – Rats
 The Looney Tunes Show – Pete Puma, Nametag Guy, Craig, Cop #2
 The Mummy: Secrets of the Medjai – Sub Pilot Dimitri
 The Plucky Duck Show – Buster Bunny (archive footage)
 The Simpsons – Additional voices
 The Weekenders – Tripp Nickerson
 The Wild Thornberrys – El Gordita
 Time Squad – Alfred Nobel, Rasputin, Thomas Jefferson
 Timon & Pumbaa – Additional voices
 Tiny Toon Adventures – Buster Bunny (replacing Charlie Adler)
 Totally Spies – Additional voices
 What-a-Mess – Additional voices

Video games 

 Afro Samurai – Soshun, Additional voices
 Batman: Arkham Origins – Voice Cast
 Bayonetta 2 – Enzo
 Bayonetta 3 – Enzo
 Bouncers – Additional voices
 Dead Rising – Adam MacIntyre, Additional voices
 Diablo III – Additional Voices
 Diablo III: Reaper of Souls – Additional voices
 EverQuest II – Additional Voices
 Final Fantasy XV – Ifrit
 Freelancer – Additional voices
 Halo 2 – Marines
 Halo 5: Guardians – Additional voices
 Halo: The Master Chief Collection – Marine (archive sound)
 Icewind Dale – Belhifet, Poquelin, Additional voices
 Lego Jurassic World – Additional voices
 Madagascar – Additional voices
 Marvel: Ultimate Alliance – Deadpool
 Marvel: Ultimate Alliance 2 – Deadpool, Venom (Wii / PS2)
 Master of Orion: Conquer the Stars – Alkari Advisor, Additional voices
 Metal Gear Rising: Revengeance – Monsoon
 MySims Kingdom – Sim
 Ninety-Nine Nights II – Galdo, Zign, Villager
 PlayStation Move Heroes – Toucan
 République – Noam Peretz
 Rocket Power: Team Rocket Rescue – Ray "Raymundo" Rocket
 Rocket Power: Beach Bandits – Ray "Raymundo" Rocket, Cyrax
 Sacrifice – Additional voices
 Shadows of the Damned – Demons
 Shrek SuperSlam – Announcer, Humpty Dumpty
 Sorcerers of the Magic Kingdom – Meeko
 Skylanders: Giants – Ghost Roaster
 Skylanders: Imaginators – Ghost Roaster, Pit Boss, Short Cut
 Skylanders: Spyro's Adventure – Additional voices
 Skylanders: SuperChargers – Ghost Roaster, Short Cut, Captain Frightbeard, Spellslamzer
 Skylanders: Swap Force – Ghost Roaster
 Skylanders: Trap Team' – Ghost Roaster, Short Cut, Rizzo
 Spider-Man: Shattered Dimensions – Scorpion 2099, Kron Stone, Deadpool's fans
 Spider-Man 3 – Additional voices
 Syphon Filter: The Omega Strain – Birchim, Co-Pilot, FBI Officer B, Officer A, Zohar
 T'ai Fu: Wrath of the Tiger – Monkey Master, Rat Pirate
 Tak: The Great Juju Challenge – Jibolba
 Tak 2: The Staff of Dreams – Jibolba
 Tak and the Power of Juju – Jibolba
 The Punisher – Additional voices
 Tiny Toon Adventures: Buster and the Beanstalk – Buster Bunny
 Ultimate Spider-Man – Additional voices
 Universe at War: Earth Assault – Additional voices
 X-Men Legends II: Rise of Apocalypse – Deadpool, Pyro, Sauron

Theatre
 3 Guys Naked from the Waist Down - Kenny Brewster
 Room Service - Faker Englund
 La Fiaca - Nester
 Reefer Madness - Ralph Wiley
 The Glorious Ones - Dottore
 Safe - Danny Green
 Man of La Mancha - Malachi Stack
 Silence! The Musical - Jack Crawford
 A Midsummer Night's Dream - Puck
 The New American Theatre Festival of New One Act Plays'' - Performer

References

External links 

1957 births
20th-century American comedians
20th-century American male actors
21st-century American comedians
21st-century American male actors
American male comedians
American male film actors
American male television actors
American male video game actors
American male voice actors
American people of Iraqi-Assyrian descent
American people of Syrian-Assyrian descent
Living people